Pierre Van Reysschoot (9 December 1906 – 9 October 1966) was a Belgian ice hockey player. He won a silver medal at the Ice Hockey European Championship 1927, and finished 5th and 13th at the 1928 and 1936 Winter Olympics, respectively.

References

External links
 

1906 births
1966 deaths
Ice hockey players at the 1928 Winter Olympics
Ice hockey players at the 1936 Winter Olympics
Olympic ice hockey players of Belgium
Sportspeople from Ghent
Belgian ice hockey centres